Survivor (Hisardut), formerly known as Survivor 10, is an Israeli reality competition game show based on the popular international Survivor television franchise. The series began in December 2007 and aired on Israeli's Channel 10 for 6 seasons. After legal issues between Channel 10 and Castaway Television, the series went on a three-year hiatus before returning in 2015 on Reshet. The show is hosted by actor and singer Guy Zu-Aretz.

Following the basic premise of other international versions of the franchise, it features a group of contestants who are marooned in an isolated location, where they must provide food, water, fire, and shelter for themselves. The contestants compete in challenges for rewards and immunity from elimination. The contestants are progressively eliminated from the game as they are voted out by their fellow contestants, until only one remains and is given the title of "The Last Survivor" and is awarded the grand prize of 1 million NIS.

Format

The show follows the format as the other editions of the show. The players are split between two "tribes", are taken to a remote isolated location and are forced to live off the land with meager supplies for an extended period of time. Frequent physical and mental challenges are used to pit the teams against each other for rewards, such as food or luxuries, or for "immunity", forcing the other tribe to attend "Tribal Council", where they must vote off one of their players.

Once about half the players are remaining, the tribes are merged into a single tribe, and competitions are on an individual basis; winning immunity prevents that player from being voted out. All of the players that are voted out at this stage form the "jury". Once two to four finalists remain, a final Tribal Council is held where the remaining players plead their case to the Jury as to why they should win the game. The jury then votes for which player should be considered the "Last Survivor" and be awarded the grand prize of 1 million NIS.

Format changes

The series features several modifications to the Survivor format unique to the Israeli production.

Challenges
Whereas most franchises feature two regular challenges, "Reward" and "Immunity", this series has included two more regular challenges — an additional individual challenge following the immunity challenge, and a duel between two players — the specific natures of which have changed over the series' history.

In the first season, the members of the tribe that lost the immunity challenge competed in the Double-Power challenge, which either granted the winner an extra vote at that night's Tribal Council or individual immunity; after the merge, all contestants competed in the Double-Power challenge, and the winner received either the power to block two contestants from voting at that night's Tribal Council or the ability to cast a second vote at Tribal Council. From the second season onward, the members of the tribe that lost the immunity challenge compete in an individual immunity challenge; after the merge, this is changed to a veto challenge between all remaining contestants, where the winner earns the power to block a tribemate from voting in that night's Tribal Council, in the form of a veto bracelet that they would give to the player whose vote they are blocking. During the last tribal council, it is used to prevent a member of the jury from voting.

There have been three different types of duel challenges used, two of which involve voted out contestants competing for a chance to return to the game. In seasons featuring the Island of the Dead, voted out contestants competed against each other in duels; the duel loser was eliminated from the game for good, while the duel winner remained on the island and awaited their next challenger, with the duel winner returning to the game at predetermined points. This was seen in seasons 1, 4 (pre-merge only), 6 (as Hope Island, with voted out players pre-merge choosing former tribemates to compete for them) and 8. In seasons 7 and 10, voted out players competed against former tribemates to steal their vote at the next Tribal Council and remain in the game. Seasons without duels involving eliminated contestants have instead featured duels between two remaining players competing for a reward or advantage, as seen in seasons 2, 3, 4 (post-merge only), 5 and 9. These duels took place immediately following the immunity challenge, and in seasons 2, 4 and 5, involved the duelists being banished to Exile Island for 24 hours, away from their tribemates.

In seasons without duels involving eliminated contestants, eliminated players have still been given the opportunity to return to the game: in season 2, castaways eliminated before the merge were given the opportunity to wait on a secluded island; those remaining at the merge competed in a single competition, with the winner returning to the game. In season 3, eliminated contestants lived on the Hidden Island, competing in a modified game for up to two weeks. In season 5, the last two contestants eliminated before the merge competed against each other, with the winner returning. In season 9, several contestants returned to the game through various methods shortly after being voted out.

Tiebreaker
Tribal Council votes ending in a tie are always resolved by a firemaking challenge between the contestants with the most votes, eschewing the runoff ballot seen in international editions. This is true even of the jury's vote for the winner, which is revealed — and, for the first six seasons, cast — during the live finale.

Endgame
The end of the game has also differed from international seasons, and changed over the course of the series' run. 
 In the first season, the final four contestants competed in two immunity challenges to determine the first two of three finalists; those two finalists plus the eight jurors voted between the two remaining contestants to determine the final eliminated contestant. Then the jurors cast their votes for the winner at the live finale, at the conclusion of the season's broadcast, and the results were immediately revealed. 
 In seasons two through six, the final contestants were subject to a public vote, where viewers were invited to vote via SMS to determine the final elimination, with the results being revealed months later at the live finale; the eliminated contestant then joined the jury. Like before, the jurors cast their votes for the winner at the live finale.
From the seventh season onward, this process was changed to resemble international seasons: the final elimination was conducted as a regular vote, and the jury's interrogation of the finalists and casting of the final vote took place during the game; the results were revealed months later during the live finale.

Airing format
Unlike the American edition, the Israeli edition airs two episodes a week, with the elimination at the end of the second episode, which results in approximately 30–40 episodes per season. The first episode will typically feature the reward and immunity challenges while the second will typically feature the duel, individual immunity or veto challenge and the Tribal Council.

Seasons

Locations

Contestants

External links
 Official Survivor Israel website 

 
2007 Israeli television series debuts
2000s Israeli television series
2010s Israeli television series